Daria Kasatkina was the defending champion, but chose not to participate this year.

Paula Badosa Gibert won the title, defeating Anna Kalinskaya in the final, 6–3, 6–3.

Seeds

Main draw

Finals

Top half

Section 1

Section 2

Bottom half

Section 3

Section 4

External links 
 Main draw

Girls' Singles
French Open, 2015 Girls' Singles